The Oliverian School is an independent alternative boarding school in Haverhill, New Hampshire, United States, serving students from 9th to 12th grade and founded in 2003 by Barclay Mackinnon, Head Emeritus. Oliverian is a small school designed for students who have had difficulty with education in more traditional settings. The school is coeducational, with approximately 36 students roughly equally split between boys and girls who are housed in single-sex converted-farmhouse dormitories located on the main and east areas of the campus. Each dorm residence is supervised by a designated dormitory parent. 

The campus is on the western edge of the White Mountains of New Hampshire and is part of a  recreational preserve, providing access to outdoor sports and cultural resources. The academic curriculum is supported by the three pillar areas of learning: adventure, arts, and stewardship. With an average class size of about five students, Oliverian maintains a 1.3-to-1 ratio between students and faculty. Over 90% of graduates matriculate directly to college or university.

The school is a member of the New England Association of Schools and Colleges (NEASC), the National Association of Independent Schools (NAIS), and the Association of Independent Schools in New England (AISNE).

References

External links

Boarding schools in New Hampshire
Private high schools in New Hampshire
Schools in Grafton County, New Hampshire
Educational institutions established in 2002
2002 establishments in New Hampshire
Haverhill, New Hampshire